Alien Minds is a science fiction novel by American writer E. Everett Evans. It was first published in 1955 by Fantasy Press in an edition of 1,417 copies. The book is a sequel to Man of Many Minds

Plot summary
The novel concerns the adventures of George Hanlan, a secret service agent who has the ability to read minds, on the planet Estrella.

Sources

External links

1955 American novels
1955 science fiction novels
American science fiction novels
Novels about telepathy
Fantasy Press books